Nenad Stankov (born January 16, 1992) is a Macedonian professional basketball Small forward who currently plays for Vardar in the Macedonian First League.

References

External links
 Basketball.eurobasket.com
 Basketball.realgm.com

1992 births
Sportspeople from Skopje
Macedonian men's basketball players
Living people
Small forwards